Lowland East Cushitic is a group of roughly two dozen diverse languages of the Cushitic branch of the Afro-Asiatic family. Its largest representatives are Oromo and Somali.

Classification
Lowland East Cushitic classification from Tosco (2020:297):

Lowland East Cushitic
Saho–Afar
Southern
Nuclear
Omo–Tana
Oromoid
Peripheral (?)
Dullay
Yaaku

Highland East Cushitic is a coordinate (sister) branch with Lowland East Cushitic in Tosco's (2020) classification.

'Core' East Cushitic classification form Bender (2020 [2008]: 91). Saho–Afar is excluded, making it equivalent to Tosco's Southern Lowland East Cushitic, and Yaaku is moved into Western Omo–Tana ('Arboroid'):

  'Core' East Cushitic
 Dullay
 SAOK
 Eastern Omo–Tana (Somaloid)
 Western Omo–Tana (Arboroid) [incl. Yaaku]
 Oromoid (Oromo–Konsoid)

Highland East Cushitic and Afar–Saho are coordinate (sister) branches with Lowland East Cushitic, together forming East Cushitic.

Overview
Lowland East Cushitic is often grouped with Highland East Cushitic (the Sidamic languages), Dullay, and Yaaku as East Cushitic, but that group is not well defined and considered dubious.

The most spoken Lowland East Cushitic language is Oromo, with about 35 million speakers in Ethiopia and Kenya. The Konsoid dialect cluster is closely related to Oromo. Other prominent languages include Somali (spoken by ethnic Somalis in Somalia, Somaliland, Ethiopia, Djibouti, and Kenya) with about 30 million speakers, and Afar (in Ethiopia, Eritrea and Djibouti) with about 1.5 million.

Robert Hetzron has suggested that the Rift languages (South Cushitic) are a part of Lowland East Cushitic, and Kießling & Mous (2003) have suggested more specifically that they be linked to a Southern Lowland branch, together with Oromo, Somali, and Yaaku–Dullay.

The vocabulary of the mixed register of Mbugu (Ma'a) may also be East Cushitic (Tosco 2002), though the grammatical basis and the other register are Bantu.

Unclassified within the Lowland languages are Girirra and perhaps the endangered Boon.

Savà and Tosco (2003) believe Ongota is an East Cushitic language with a Nilo-Saharan substratum—that is, that Ongota speakers shifted to East Cushitic from an earlier Nilo-Saharan language, traces of which still remain. However, Fleming (2006) considers it to be an independent branch of Afroasiatic.

See also
Languages of Ethiopia

References

Roland Kießling & Maarten Mous. 2003. The Lexical Reconstruction of West-Rift Southern Cushitic. Cushitic Language Studies Volume 21
Tosco, Mauro. 2000. 'Cushitic Overview.' Journal of Ethiopian Studies 33(2):87-121.
Savà, Graziano and Mauro Tosco. 2003. "The classification of Ongota". In Bender et al. eds, Selected comparative-historical Afrasian linguistic studies. LINCOM Europa.

Further reading
Black, Paul David. 1974. Lowland East Cushitic: Subgrouping and Reconstruction. Yale University. Doctoral dissertation, New Haven: Yale University.

de:Tieflandostkuschitische Sprachen